Oyaca is a neighborhood of District of Gölbaşı, Ankara Province, Turkey.

Oyarca itself has two neighborhoods of its own, Akarsu and Yeşilçam.

References

Populated places in Ankara Province
Neighbourhoods of Gölbaşı, Ankara